Dawaun Parker (born May 9, 1984) is an American record producer and rapper. After graduating from Berklee College of Music in 2005, he became a producer for Dr. Dre’s record label Aftermath Entertainment. He received his first formal credit on 50 Cent’s [[Get Rich or Die Tryin' (soundtrack)|Get Rich or Die Tryin''' soundtrack]], and contributed to several songs on Busta Rhymes' number 1 album, The Big Bang, as well as Jay-Z's return record, Kingdom Come. Parker co-wrote the number 1 single, "Crack a Bottle", by Eminem, Dr. Dre and 50 Cent, and co-produced nearly every track on Relapse.

On October 20, 2010, Parker released his first single, Lost, co-produced by Dr. Dre and featuring Phil Beaudreau. Since he left Aftermath sometime in 2014, he has been working on several projects, including production on Phil Beaudreau's album Ether''.

Production 
 50 Cent – Come & Go
 50 Cent feat. Nicole Scherzinger & Young Buck – Fire
 50 Cent – I Get It In
 50 Cent – Talk About Me
 50 Cent – Death To My Enemies
 50 Cent feat. Eminem – Psycho
 50 Cent – Straight to the Bank
 Bishop Lamont – No Stoppin' Carson
 Bishop Lamont – Grow Up
 Bobby Digital – Up Again
 Busta Rhymes – Get You Some
 Busta Rhymes – How We Do It Over Here
 Busta Rhymes feat. Nas – Don't Get Carried Away
 Busta Rhymes feat. Q-Tip – You Can't Hold The Torch
 Busta Rhymes – Legend Of The Fall Off's
 Busta Rhymes feat. Raekwon – Goldmine
 Busta Rhymes feat. Rick James – In The Ghetto
 Busta Rhymes feat. Stevie Wonder – Been Through The Storm
 Cory Gunz – Go Slow
 Dawaun Parker – Lost (Co-Produced By Dr. Dre)
 Dawaun Parker – Schemin'
 Eminem feat. Dr. Dre and 50 Cent – Crack A Bottle
 Eminem – Hello
 Eminem – Medicine Ball
 Eminem – Same Song & Dance
 Eminem feat. Dr. Dre – Old Time's Sake
 Eminem – Must Be the Ganja
 Eminem – 3 A.M.
 Eminem – My Mom
 Eminem – Insane
 Eminem – Bagpipes From Baghdad
 Eminem – We Made You
 Eminem – Stay Wide Awake
 Eminem – Déjà Vu
 Eminem – Underground
 Eminem – Im Having A Relapse
 Eminem feat. Dr. Dre – Hell Breaks Loose
 Eminem – Taking My Ball
 Eminem – Music Box
 Eminem – Drop The Bomb On 'Em
 Eminem – So Bad
 Eminem – Walk On Water
 Eminem – Premonition (Intro)
 Eminem – Alfred (Interlude)
 Eminem – Never Love Again
 Eminem – Little Engine
 Eminem – Lock It Up
 Eminem – Alfred (Outro)
 G.A.G.E. feat. Raekwon & Jabar – Goin Leave You
 Game – Blood of Christ
 Game – Dead People
 The GodBody – Beef
 The GodBody – The Fly Butter (Holy Smokes)
 The GodBody – Just Another Day
 The GodBody – Fell Off
 Jay Z – 30 Something
 Jay-Z – Lost One
 Jay-Z – Trouble
 Jay-Z feat. Ne-Yo – Minority Report
 Joe Budden – Hate Me
 Joyner Lucas - Just Like You
 Joyner Lucas - Lullaby
 Kendrick Lamar – Black Boy Fly
 Raekwon – Catalina
 Raekwon – About Me
 Snoop Dogg – Round Here
 Snoop Dogg feat. Dr. Dre and D'Angelo – Imagine
 Snoop Dogg feat. Nate Dogg and – Boss' Life
 Stat Quo – Get Low
 T.I. – Why You Wanna
 Travis Barker feat. The Clipse & Kobe – City Of Dreams
 Travis Barker and Yelawolf – Director's Cut
 Young Buck – Hold On
 Young Buck – U Ain't Goin' Nowhere

Awards and nominations

References

External links
 Aftermath Entertainment website
 Berklee Today

African-American musicians
American performers of Christian music
Record producers from Rhode Island
Hip hop record producers
Living people
1983 births
Musicians from Providence, Rhode Island
American keyboardists
Berklee College of Music alumni
Aftermath Entertainment artists
21st-century African-American people
20th-century African-American people